A riwaq (or rivaq,   or ) is an arcade or portico (if in front of entrances) open on at least one side. It is an architectural design element in Islamic architecture and Islamic garden design.

A riwaq often serves as the transition space between interior and outdoor spaces. As portico or arcade structure, it provides shade and adjustment to sunlight in hot climates, and cover from rain in any locale.

Arcade
As an arcade element the structure is often found surrounding and defining the courtyards of mosques and madrasas, and used for covered circulation, meeting and rest, and ritual circumambulation. The arcade element is also found along principal walkways of larger bazaars.

Examples
Riwaq arcade examples include: 
Surrounding the Kaaba in the Masjid al-Haram mosque courtyard in Mecca, and the Mosque of Uqba courtyard in Tunisia.
Along the main avenues of the Bazaar of Kashan, in present-day Iran.

See also
Index: Islamic architectural elements

References

External links

Arcades (architecture)
Arabic architecture
Islamic architectural elements
Architectural elements
Passive cooling